Gregory Paul Walden (born January 10, 1957) is an American politician who served as the U.S. representative for  from 1999 to 2021. He is a Republican. Walden is the son of three-term Oregon State Representative Paul E. Walden. In October 2019, Walden announced that he would not run for reelection in 2020.

Early life, education and career
Walden was born in The Dalles, Oregon, the son of Elizabeth (née McEwen) and Paul Ernest Walden. He earned a Bachelor of Science degree at the University of Oregon in 1981. Before being elected to Congress, Walden owned and ran radio stations.

Political career 
Walden served as press secretary and chief of staff to Congressman Denny Smith from 1981 to 1987. He was elected to the Oregon House of Representatives in 1988 and served in the House until 1995, when he was appointed to the Oregon State Senate to fill a vacancy that opened up when Wes Cooley was elected to the U. S. House. Walden rose to the position of assistant majority leader in the Senate and was considering a bid for Oregon Governor in 1994. But upon discovering that the son he and his wife were expecting had a heart defect, Walden decided to not run for governor or seek reelection to the state senate. Their son died soon after birth.

Walden was tapped as campaign manager for Cooley's reelection bid, but after Cooley was caught in several lies about his military service, Walden was one of many Republicans who called on Cooley to drop out of the race. Walden went as far as to announce he was running for the 2nd District seat as an independent. But he served as the Oregon chairman of Bob Dole's presidential campaign, and touted his "strong Republican credentials", implying that he would serve as a Republican if elected. Walden's candidacy led to fears that the Democrats could take advantage of a split in the Republican vote and take a seat they hadn't held since 1981. This ended when Cooley's predecessor, Bob Smith, was called out of retirement.

Smith did not run for reelection in 1998. Walden easily won the Republican primary and the November general election. His district contains some liberal-leaning communities such as Ashland and his hometown, Hood River, but most of it leans heavily Republican, and Walden has been reelected ten times without serious difficulty, never receiving less than 60% of the vote except in 2018, when he received 56%. In 2002, he defeated Democrat Peter Buckley, who later became a member of the Oregon House of Representatives. In 2006, Walden defeated Democratic nominee Carol Voisin, and in 2008 he won a sixth term with 70% of the vote over Democrat Noah Lemas and Pacific Green Tristin Mock. After Senator Gordon Smith's defeat in the 2008 elections, Walden became the only Republican representing Oregon in Congress.

On October 28, 2019, Walden announced that he would not run for reelection. He disagreed with President Donald Trump over Trump's attempts to finance his border wall project and backed sanctioning Russia despite Trump's resistance. He voted to end the 35-day government shutdown and spoke up about the global warming crisis, but supported Trump in the Ukraine quid pro quo scandal.

U.S. House of Representatives

Party leadership
House Speaker John Boehner chose Walden to be chairman of the House Majority Transition Committee. He served as chairman of the House Republican leadership through most of 2010.

After the 2012 elections, Walden became chair of the National Republican Congressional Committee. In July 2014, he announced he would seek a second term as chair, arguing he would help provide continuity in a changing leadership team after the defeat of House Majority Leader Eric Cantor. He served a second term, the traditional limit for holders of the office, ending in 2016.

Committee assignments
 Committee on Energy and Commerce
 Subcommittee on Communications and Technology (Chairman)
 Subcommittee on Energy and Power

From 2010 to 2011, Walden gave up his seat on the Committee on Energy and Commerce at Republican leadership's request so that Parker Griffith, who had recently switched parties, could take his spot.

Walden founded the Small Brewers Caucus and the Digital Television Caucus; as of 2007, he was a member of 39 congressional caucuses.

Walden was also a member of the centrist Republican Main Street Partnership, the Congressional Cement Caucus and the Congressional Western Caucus.

Legislation sponsored
The following is an incomplete list of legislation Walden has introduced into the House of Representatives.
 Central Oregon Jobs and Water Security Act (H.R. 2640; 113th Congress), a land-use and water bill related to the Crooked River in Oregon and the Bowman Dam. H.R. 2640 would modify features of the Crooked River Project in central Oregon, near Prineville, and prioritize how water from the project is allocated.  President Barack Obama signed the bill into law in December 2014.
 Federal Communications Commission Process Reform Act of 2013 (H.R. 3675; 113th Congress), a bill that would make a number of changes to procedures that the Federal Communications Commission (FCC) follows in its rule-making processes. The FCC would have to act in more transparently and accept public input on regulations. Walden said the bill was written in response, among other things, to a proposed FCC study on the newspaper editorial boards' decisions. Walden argued that "Americans deserve greater... transparency and accountability from their government," particularly because "an item as controversial as this study made it all the way through the FCC without so much as a commission vote." He called the study dangerous because it threatened the papers' free speech and freedom of the press rights.
 Hermiston Reversionary Interest Release Act (H.R. 3366; 113th Congress), a bill that would release the interest of the United States in some land being used for Oregon State University's Agricultural Research and Extension Center in Hermiston, Oregon. This would enable the center to relocate without its land being returned to the federal government. The Bureau of Land Management opposed the bill and it died in the Senate Committee on Energy and Natural Resources. 
 STELA Reauthorization Act of 2014 (H.R. 4572; 113th Congress), a bill related to the regulation of satellite broadcasting.

Intervention in Malheur Wildlife Refuge issues 
Walden, whose district office includes the Malheur National Wildlife Refuge, said that although one militant was killed and another wounded in the armed occupation of the refuge, "We can all be grateful that today has ended peacefully, and that this situation is finally over. Now, life in Harney County can begin to return to normal and the community can begin the long process of healing." He complained about allegedly poor federal forest and land management policies during the occupation, and said he would like to see changes to those policies: "We need to foster a more cooperative spirit between the federal agencies and the people who call areas like Harney County home." On June 27, 2018, Walden pleaded for a pardon for Dwight and Steven Hammond, who repeatedly committed arson and threatened federal refuge workers over an 18-year period, saying that the original trial's federal judge, Michael Robert Hogan, said that the mandatory sentence would "shock the conscious [sic]". On July 10, Trump pardoned both men, commuting their sentences to time served. Steven had been scheduled to be released on June 29, 2019, and Dwight on February 13, 2020.

Personal life

Walden and his wife, Mylene, live in Hood River with their son Anthony. They are members of the Episcopal Church in the United States of America and participate in local civic groups such as the Rotary Club and the Chamber of Commerce.

Walden was a licensed amateur (ham) radio operator, W7EQI.

On January 31, 2007, Walden sold Columbia Gorge Broadcasting, which runs five stations in the eastern Columbia River Gorge, to Bicoastal Columbia River LLC in order to avoid any conflict of interest that might arise with his congressional duties.

Electoral history

References

External links

 
 

 Greg Walden at The Oregonian

|-

|-

|-

|-

1957 births
20th-century American politicians
21st-century American politicians
American Episcopalians
Living people
Republican Party members of the Oregon House of Representatives
Republican Party Oregon state senators
People from Hood River, Oregon
People from The Dalles, Oregon
Republican Party members of the United States House of Representatives from Oregon
Amateur radio people